"On ne change pas" (meaning "We do not change" or "One does not change") is the third and last commercial single from Celine Dion's album, S'il suffisait d'aimer (1998). It was released on 1 March 1999 in Francophone countries. It was written and produced by Jean-Jacques Goldman.

Background and release
"On ne change pas" music video was directed by Gilbert Namiand (1999) and included later on Dion's On ne change pas DVD. Dion's only appearances in the video are in the form of photographs taken of her with her grade-school class at age eight. A second version of the video exists, containing similar footage, but focusing more on the young girl. This version also features several scenes of Dion in the studio recording the song, as well as moments from her career.

In Quebec, "On ne change pas" entered the chart on 27 February 1999, topped it for six weeks and spent fifty-one weeks there in total. The single was released in selected European countries, reaching number 16 in Belgium Wallonia and number 17 in France.

A live version of "On ne change pas" appeared on the Au cœur du stade album and DVD. The latter also included footage of Dion recording of this song in a bonus feature. Dion also performed the song live during her historic performance in front of 250,000 spectators to celebrate Quebec's 400th anniversary, which was included on Céline sur les Plaines DVD in 2008.  The song was also performed for the Sans attendre Tour of 2013; the Quebec City performance was included in the Céline... une seule fois / Live 2013 CD/DVD. Dion also performed this song during her Taking Chances World Tour in the city of Antwerp, Belgium in 2008, and her French concerts in 2017.

The track became a part of the On ne change pas greatest hits compilation in 2005.

Formats and track listings
European CD single
"On ne change pas" – 4:08
"Sur le même bateau" – 4:25

Charts

Weekly charts

Year-end charts

Release history

References

External links

1998 songs
1999 singles
Celine Dion songs
Columbia Records singles
French-language songs
Songs written by Jean-Jacques Goldman